is a company managing the commercial distribution center and the Semboku Rapid Railway in Osaka Prefecture, Japan. It was formerly known as third-sector company  until June 30, 2014. Osaka Prefectural Urban Development and its subsidiary company were called the  together.

Business summary

The main purpose of the company that most are familiar with is the operation of the Semboku Rapid Railway in southern Osaka Prefecture. The railroad starts at Nakamozu Station on the Nankai Kōya Line and ends at Izumi-Chūō Station. During the 1960s, the Osaka Prefectural government planned a route link to Semboku New Town, one of many planned communities at the time of the post-war boom. The Nankai Electric Railway was to undertake the total planning, construction and operation of the new route, but because Nankai had several large accidents in the later half of that decade, Japan's national railroad safety board forced Nankai to purchase new rolling stock and start restoration track and wayside equipment. Because of the required sudden investment, Nankai stalled on the Semboku line's construction timetable. The Osaka prefectural government, using an existing third sector company, stepped in to undertake the new railway's construction and operation.

In addition to this, the original business as a logistics distribution center management body is still in operation. There are currently two truck terminals under its management in the following locations:

Higashi Osaka commercial distribution center
Kita-Osaka commercial distribution center

On July 1, 2014, the share of the company owned by the prefectural government was transferred to Nankai Electric Railway and the company joined the Nankai Group.

Railroad route
Semboku Rapid Railway

Subsidiary companies
Semboku Railway Service
Sentersu Industries
Rinku International Physical Distribution
Panjo
Osaka Rinku Hotel

References

External links

 

Companies based in Osaka Prefecture
Railway companies of Japan
Urban development
Nankai Group
Semboku Rapid Railway